This is a list of programs broadcast by CBC Television, including current and former programming as well as soon-to-be-broadcast programming.

Current programming

Anthology series
 Canadian Reflections (June 10, 1978 – present)
 q (June 11, 2013 – present)
 The Filmmakers (July 22, 2017 – present)
 Hot Docs at Home (April 2020 – present)
 Movie Night in Canada (March 14, 2020 – present)
 Undisrupted (2021)

Comedy series
 Just for Laughs (July 14, 1983 – present)
 This Hour Has 22 Minutes (October 11, 1993 – present)
 Workin' Moms (January 10, 2017 – present)
 Broad Appeal: Living with E's (2020–present)
 Humour Resources (January 5, 2021 – present)
 Strays (September 14, 2021 – present)
 Overlord and the Underwoods (October 29, 2021 – present)
 Sort Of (November 9, 2021 – present)
 Son of a Critch (January 4, 2022 – present)
 Run the Burbs (January 5, 2022 – present)
 Fakes (September 1, 2022)

Drama series
 Heartland (October 14, 2007 – present)
 Murdoch Mysteries (January 20, 2008 – present)
 Coroner (January 7, 2019 – present)
 Moonshine (September 14, 2021 – present)
 The Porter (February 21, 2022 – present)
 SkyMed (July 10, 2022 – present)

Reality series and game show 
 Dragons' Den (October 3, 2006 – present)
 Battle of the Blades (October 4, 2009 – November 17, 2013; September 19, 2019 – present)
 Still Standing (June 23, 2015 – present)
 The Great Canadian Baking Show (November 1, 2017 – present)
 You Can't Ask That (2019–present)
 Family Feud Canada (December 16, 2019 – present)
 Fridge Wars (February 27, 2020 – present)
 Race Against the Tide (premiering 2021)
 Stay Tooned (2022)
 Canada's Ultimate Challenge (2023)

News/documentary programming
 Regional newscasts
CBC News: Morning
 The National (1954–present)
 The Nature of Things (1960–present)
 Land and Sea (1964–present)
 Marketplace (October 5, 1972 – present)
  The Fifth Estate (1975–present)
 The Passionate Eye (1993–present)
 Absolutely Canadian (2009–present)
 CBC Docs POV (2015–present)
 Exhibitionists (2015–present)
 Rosemary Barton Live (2020–present)
 Good People (2020–present)
Anyone's Game (January 15, 2021 – present)

Sports programming (CBC Sports)

 Hockey Night in Canada (1952–present; formerly in production until 2014; now produced by Rogers Media)
 Olympics on CBC (1956–present), which includes:
 Summer Olympics 
 Winter Olympics

Children's programming (CBC Kids)

International programming
 Coronation Street (May 31, 1971 – present)
 Escape to the Country (2014–present)
 Bondi Vet (2015–present)
 Grand Designs (2015–present)
 When Calls the Heart (2015–present)
 The Great British Bake Off (2018–present)
 Call the Midwife (2020–present)
 Jamie's 30-Minute Meals (2020–present)
Miss Scarlet and The Duke (March 31, 2020 – present)

Repeats
 Mr. D (January 9, 2012 – December 19, 2018)
 Nirvanna the Band the Show
 Schitt's Creek (2015–2020)

Upcoming programming

Drama
 Essex County (premiering March 2023)
 Plan B (premiering February 2023)
 The Red (premiering 2023)

In development
 Late Bloomer

Formerly broadcast by CBC Television

Domestically-produced programming

 11 Cameras (2006–2007)
 18 to Life (2010–2011)
 20/20 (1962–1967)
 21 Thunder (2017)
 55 North Maple (1970–1971)
 72 Hours: True Crime (2004–2007)
 9B (1986–1989)
 A Choice of Futures (1967)
 A City Story (1971)
 A Date with Frosia (1954)
 A Long View of Canadian History (1959)
 A Midsummer Theatre (1958)
 A Month of Sundays (1981)
 A Place for Everything (1964–1966)
 A Place of Your Own (1968–1971)
 A Show from Two Cities (1963–1964)
 A Summer Night (1962)
 About Canada (1956–1957)
 Absolutely Canadian (2016)
 Adrienne at Large (1974–1975) 
 Adrienne Clarkson Presents (1988–1999)
 Adventures in Rainbow Country (1970–1971)
 After Four (1977–1978)
 Air Farce Live (1973–1997)
 Airwaves (1986–1987)
 Alan Hamel's Comedy Bag (1972–1973)
 Alan Watts on Living (1971)
 Albert's Place (1959)
 Album of History (1967)
 Alias Grace (2017)
 All Around the Circle (1964–1975)
 Alphabet Soup (1971–1973)
 An American in Canada (2003–2004)
 Anne of Green Gables (1985)
 Anne with an E (March 19, 2017 – November 24, 2019)
 Any Woman Can (1974–1975)
 Applause, Applause (1974)
 Aquarium (1974)
 Arctic Air (2012–2014)
 Are You Putting Me On? (1975–1977)
 Art in Action (1959–1961)
 Arts '73/'74/'75 (1973–1975)
 Astronomy Today (1959)
 At the Hotel (2006)
 Atlantic Summer (1978–1979)
 Audubon Wildlife Theatre (1968–1974)
 Background (1959–1962)
 Bagatelle (1974)
 Ballads and Bards (1962–1963)
 Bandwagon with Bob Francis (1972–1973; 1975)
 Barbara Frum (1974–1975)
 Barney Boomer (1967–1968)
 Barney's Gang (1958)
 Baroness von Sketch Show (2016–2021)
 The Beachcombers (1972–1990)
 Becoming Canadian (2017)
 Being Erica (2009–2011; 2022)
 Beethoven Lives Upstairs (1992 TV film)
 Bellevue (2016)
 Best Recipes Ever (2010–2014)
 Beyond Reason (1977–1980)
 The Big Revue (1952–1953)
 Bixby and Me (1975–1976)
 Black Harbour (1996–1999)
 Blackstone (2015)
 Blizzard Island (1987–1988)
 Bluff (1976–1977)
 The Bob McLean Show (1975–1981)
 The Book of Negroes (2015)
 The Border (2008–2010)
 The Boys from Baghdad High (2008 TV film)
 Burden of Truth (2018–2021)
 Call For Music (1957–1958)
 Camera West (1964–1967)
 Canada 98/99/100 (1964–1967)
 Canada After Dark (1978–1979)
 Canada: A People's History (2000–2001)
 Canada File (1961)
 Canada Outdoors (1967)
 Canada's Smartest Person (2014–2018)
 Canadian Antiques Roadshow (2005)
 The Canadian Establishment (1980)
 The Canadian Experience (2004–2005)
 Canadian Express (1977–1980)
 The Canadian Farmer (1959)
 Canada: The Story of Us (2017)
 Cannonball, (1958–1959)
 Careers to Come (1976—1977)
 Carica-Tours (1952)
 Cartoon Storybook (1959)
 A Case for the Court (1960–1962)
 Catch a Rising Star (1976)
 Catch Up (1978–1979)
 Caught (2018)
 Cavendish (2019)
 CBC Championship Curling (1966–1979)
 CBC Concert (1952)
 CBC Concert Hour (1954–55)
 CBC Drama '73 (September 30 to December 2, 1973)
 CBC Family Hour (anthology series, 1989–c. 2001)
 CBC Film Festival (1979–80)
 CBC Music Backstage Pass (2013–2020)
 CBC News: Sunday (2002–2009)
 CBC Selects (2014)
 CBC Summer Symphonies (1978)
 Ceilidh (1973–1974)
 Celebrity Cooks (1975–1979)
 The Challenge of the Lonely Sky (1974)
 Charcoal Chefs (1976–1978)
 Charlie Had One But He Didn't Like It, So He Gave It To Us (1966)
 Chasing Rainbows (1988)
 Check-Up (1963)
 Chez Hélène (1959–1973)
 Children's Cinema (1969–1975)
 Chilly Beach (2003–2005)
 Chrysler Festival (1957)
 Cities (1979–1980)
 Click (Canadian TV series) (1962)
 CODCO (1987–1992)
 The Collaborators (1973–1974)
 The College Game (1977–1978)
 Colombo Quotes (1978)
 Come Dance with Us (1960)
 Come Fly with Me (1958)
 Come Listen Awhile (1963–1964)
 Comics! (1993–1999)
 Coming Up Rosie (1975–1978)
 Commonwealth Jazz Club (1965)
 Concerning Women (1976)
 Conquest of Space (1969)
 Converging Lines (1977)
 Country Canada
 Concerto (1976)
 Counterpoint (1967)
 Country Hoedown (1956–1965)
 Countrytime (1960–1966)
 Countrytime (1970–1974)
 Court of Opinions (1952)
 Cracked (2013–2014)
 Crash Gallery (2015–2017)
 Crawford (February 2, 2018)
 Creative Persons (1968; partly produced abroad)
 Cross Canada Curling (1961–1965)
 Crosspoint (1977)
 Curling Classic (1973–1979)
 Customer (Dis)Service (2012)
 Da Vinci's City Hall (2005–2006)
 Da Vinci's Inquest (1998–2005)
 Daily Tips for Modern Living (1998)
 Danger Bay (1984–1990)
 Dateline (1955–1956)
 The David Clayton-Thomas Show (1973)
 Day of Decision (1959)
 Degrassi Junior High (1987–1989)
 Degrassi High (1989–1991)
 Delilah (1973)
 The Detectives (2018–2020)
 The Diane Stapley Show (1976)
 Dianne (1971)
 Dieppe (1993–1994)
 The Disordered Mind (1960, 1963, 1966)
 Disclosure (2001–2004)
 Discovery (1962–1963)
 Distinguished Canadians (1971–1972)
 Do It for Yourself (1982–1985)
 Doc Zone (2007–2015)
 Dollars and Sense (1972–1975)
 Don Messer's Jubilee (1957–1969)
 Dooley Gardens (1999)
 Double Up (1974)
 The Doug Crosley Show (1973)
 Diggstown (2019—2022)
 Downton Abbey
 Dr. Zonk and the Zunkins (1974–1975)
 Drama at Ten (1955–1956)
 Dress Rehearsal – see Drop–In (1970)
 Drop the Beat (2000)
 Drop-In (1970–1974)
 Earthbound (1982)
 Ed and Ross (1957, 1959)
 The Ed Evanko Show (1967)
 Edgemont (2001–2005)
 The Edison Twins (1982–1986)
 Ekhaya: A Family Chronicle (1997)
 Sharon, Lois & Bram's Elephant Show (1984–1990)
 Ear to the Ground (1992–1995)
 Empire, Inc. (1983)
 Encounter (1958)
 Encounter (1970–1974)
 Enslaved (2020)
 Exploring Minds (1953–1956)
 Eye of the Beholder (1974)
 Fashion File (1989–2009)
 Fashion File: Host Hunt (2007–2009)
 Ferment (1965)
 Film Fun (1974–1976)
 Final Audition (1978)
 The First Five Years (1971–1974)
 First Person Singular: Pearson – The Memoirs of a Prime Minister (1973–1975)
 The Fit Stop (1974–1975) 
 Five Years in the Life (1968–1972)
 Flappers (1979–1981)
 Flight – The Passionate Affair (1976)
 Floor Show (1953)
 Fool Canada (2015)
 Football Huddle (1960)
 For the Record (1976–1984)
 The Forest Rangers (1963–1965)
 Fortier (2000–2004)
 Fortunate Son (2020)
 Four Directions (1998)
 Four in the Morning (2016)
 Four on the Floor (1986)
 Fraggle Rock (1983–1987)
 Frankie Drake Mysteries (2017–2021)
 Fred Penner's Place (1985–1997)
 French for Love (1965–1966)
 The Friendly Giant (1958–1985)
 Friday Night with Ralph Benmergui (1992–1993)
 From the Vaults (2018)
 Front Page Challenge (1957–1995)
 Gallery (1973–1979)
 The Game of Scouting (1967)
 General Motors Theatre (1953–1961)
 Generation (1965)
 George Stroumboulopoulos Tonight (2005–2014)
 Getting Along Famously (2006)
 A Gift to Last (1976; 1978–1979)
 The Gill Deacon Show (2006–2007)
 The Goods (2016–2018)
 Good Rockin' Tonite (1983–1993)
 The Great Canadian Culture Hunt (1976)
 The Great Canadian Escape (1977)
 Great Canadian Food Show 
 The Great Detective (1979–1982)
 The Greatest Canadian (2004)
 The Greatest Canadian Invention (2007)
 Guess My Story (1954)
 Guilty or Not Guilty (1958–1959)
 Gullage's (1996–1997)
 Hangin' In (1981–1987)
 Hans in the Kitchen (1953–1954)
 Hard Times (1975)
 Hatching, Matching and Dispatching (2005–2006)
 Haunted Studio (1954)
 He Shoots, He Scores (1986)
 Healthier, Wealthier, Wiser? (1965)
 Hello Goodbye (2016–2019)
 Here and There (1955–1958)
 Here to Stay (1976–1977)
 Hi Diddle Day (1969–1976)
 History Makers (1970)
 Hobby Workshop (1953–1955)
 Hockeyville (2006)
 Holiday Canada (1968)
 Holiday Ranch (1953–1958)
 Home Fires (1980–1983)
 Homemade TV (1976–1977)
 Home Movies: The Great Canadian Film Caper (1966)
 How About That? (1953–1954)
 How it Happens (1973)
 Howard Presents (1978)
 Howie Mandel's Sunny Skies (1995)
 Howie Meeker's Hockey School (1973–1977)
 Human Cargo (2004)
 Hymn Sing (1965–1995)
 Images of Canada (1972–1976)
 In Concert (1981)
 In the Common Interest (1955–1956)
 In the Kitchen with Stefano Faita (2011–2014)
 In the Mood (1971–1972)
 In the South Seas (1973)
 In Opposition (1989)
 In View (1962–1963)
 InSecurity (2011–2012)
 Inside Canada (1973–1974)
 Intelligence (2006–2007)
 International Law (1961)
 Interrupt This Program (2015–2017)
 The Inventors (1979)
 The Irish Rovers (1971–1978)
 Is There Life After Youth? (1974)
 It's a Living (1989–2003)
 It's a Musical World (1973–1975)
 It's Only Rock & Roll (1987)
 It's the Law (1956)
 Jake and the Kid (1961)
 Jazz Canada (1980)
 Jazz with Jackson (1953–1955)
 The Jim Coleman Show (1959–1960)
 Jimmy MacDonald's Canada (2005)
 The John Allan Cameron Show (1979–1980)
 Jonovision (1996–2001)
 The Journal (1982–1992)
 Jozi-H (2006–2007)
 Just Ask, Inc. (1981)
 Kaleidosport (1967–1972)
 Keith Hampshire's Music Machine (1973–1975)
 Kenny vs. Spenny (2003–2004)
 Keeping Canada Alive (2015)
 Keeping Canada Safe (2017)
 Keynotes (1964)
 The Kids in the Hall (1988–1995)
 The Kids of Degrassi Street (1979–1986)
 Kim's Convenience (2016–2022)
 King of Kensington (1975–1980)
 Klahanie (1967–1978)
 Lady is a Four Letter Word (1975)
 Landmark (1970)
 The Lenny Breau Show (1966)
 Leo and Me (1976–1981)
 Let's Do It (1974)
 Let's Face It (1963)
 Let's Go to the Museum (1954–1956)
 Let's Make Music (1953–1954)
 Let's Sing Out (1963–1967)
 Let's Speak English (1961–1962)
 Let's Talk Music (1962–1967)
 Liberty Street (1995)
 Life and the Land (1966)
 Life and Times (1996–2007)
 Little Dog (2018–2019)
 Little Miracles 
 Little Mosque on the Prairie (2007–2012)
 Live and Learn (1959–1965)
 The Lively Arts (1961–1964)
 Living... (2007–2009)
 Long Shot (1959)
 Look Who's Here (1975–1976)
 Made in Canada (1998–2003)
 Maggie Muggins (1955–1962)
 The Magic Lie (1977–1979)
 The Magic of Music (1955–1958)
 Make the Politician Work (2009–2011)
 Making the Cut: Last Man Standing (2004–2006)
 The Man from Tomorrow (1958)
 Man in a Landscape (1963)
 Mansbridge: One on One (1999–2017)
 Marc's Grab Bag (1973-4)
 Marquee (1979–1980)
 Mary Walsh: Open Book 
 Material World (1990–1993)
 Max Glick (1990–1991)
 Medical Explorers (1973)
 Memorandum on a Frozen Ark (1970)
 The Men and the Issues (1963)
 Mexico (1966)
 Michael: Every Day (2011–2017)
 Midday (1985–2000)
 Midweek (1971–1972)
 The Mills of Power (1990)
 Mister X in Canada (1960)
 Monday Night Special (1961)
 Moneymakers (1975–1979)
 Moods of Man (1968)
 The Morgan Waters Show (comedy)
 Mosquito Lake (1989–1990)
 Movies with Manings (1959–1960)
 Mr. Chips 
 Mr. Dressup (1967–2006)
 Mr Piper (1963)
 Mr. Wizard (1951–1965)
 Music Canada (1966–1967)
 Music For a Sunday Afternoon (1967)
 Music to Remember (1970)
 Music to See (1957 TV series) (1957)
 Music to See (1970s TV series) (1970–1979)
 Musical Moods (1958)
 My Kind of Country (1971)
 The National Dream (1974)
 New Film Makers (1969)
 News Profile (1972–1974)
 The Newcomers (1977–1980)
 Newsfile (1973)
 The Newsroom (1996–2005)
 NFB Film Can (1979)
 Nic and Pic (1975–1977)
 Ninety Minutes Live (1976–1978)
 North of 60 (1992–1997)
 North/South (2006)
 Northwood (1991–1994)
 Not My Department (1987)
 Nothing Too Good for a Cowboy (1998–1999)
 Now's Your Chance (1952–1954)
 Nursery School Time (1958–1963)
 The Odyssey (1992–1994)
 Of All People (1972–1974)
 O'Keefe Centre Presents (1967–1968)
 The Oland Murder (2020)
 Old Testament Tales (1957)
 Ombudsman (1974–1980)
 On Guard For Thee (1981)
 On the Evidence (1975–1977)
 On the Frontier of Space (1959)
 OWL/TV (1985–1990)
 On the Road Again (1987–2007)
 One More Time (1969–1970)
 One Night Stand (1976)
 One Northern Summer (1971–1977)
 Open House (1952–1962)
 Opening Night
 The Other Eye (1967)
 Our Hero (2000–2002)
 Outdoors with Hal Denton (1955)
 Outlook (1960)
 Outlook (1966)
 Over the Line Fence (1956)
 Par 27 (1978–1980)
 The Passionate Canadians (1977)
 Passport to Adventure (1965–1967) 
 Pat and Ernie (1961)
 People in Parties (1960)
 Peep Show (1975–1976)
 The Peggy Neville Show (1966–1967)
 The Peppermint Prince (1956–1957)
 Pencil Box (1976–1979)
 People of Our Times (1974–77)
 People Talking Back (1979)
 Pifffle & Co. (1971)
 Pilot One (1989)
 The Plouffe Family (1954–1959)
 Prairie Spotlight
 Programme X
 Pure (2017)
 Quebec in English (1965)
 Quelque Show (1975)
 Quentin Durgens, M.P. (1965–1969)
 Question Mark (1963–1974)
 Quintet (TV series) (1962)
 Rabbittown (2006)
 The Raccoons (1985–1999)
 Range Ryder and the Calgary Kid (1977)
 The Rare Breed
 Razzle Dazzle (1961–1966)
 Reach for the Top (1961–1985)
 Recipe to Riches (2014)
 The Red Green Show (1997–2006)
 Red Serge (1986–1987)
 Regional File
 Reluctant Nation (1966)
 René Simard
 Replay (1971–74)
 Republic of Doyle (2010–2014)
 The Restless Wave (1970)
 The Rez (1996–1998)
 Rhapsody (1958-9)
 Rick Mercer Report (2004–2018)
 Rideau Hall (2002)
 Rita and Friends (1994–1997)
 Riverdale (1997–2000)
 The Romance of Science (1960)
 The Road to Adjustment (1960)
 Road to Avonlea (1990–1996)
 Rock Wars (1985)
 Rocket Robin Hood (1966–1969)
 The Romeo Section (2015–2016)
 The Ron James Show (2009–2014)
 The Rovers Comedy House (1981)
 Rumours (2006–2007)
 St. Lawrence North (1960)
 Saturday Date with Billy O'Connor (1958-9)
 Saturday Night Movies (1977)
 Saturday Night Wrestling 
 Scarlett Hill (1962–1964)
 Science and Conscience (1968)
 Science Magazine (1975–1979)
 SCTV (1976–1984)
 Search for Stars
 Seaway (1965–1966)
 See for Yourself (1959–60)
 Seeing Things (1981–1987)
 Sesame Park (1996–2001)
 Shoot the Messenger (2016)
 Side Effects (1994–1996)
 Sidestreet (1975–1978)
 Sight and Cast (1965-6)
 Singalong Jubilee (1961–1974)
 Sit Back with Jack (1960)
 SketchCom (1998–1999)
 Skipper and Company 
 SmartAsk (2001–2004)
 Snakes and Ladders (2004)
 Snapshots (2016)
 Some Honourable Members (1973-5)
 Some of My Best Friends are Men (1975)
 The Song Shop (1958)
 Sophie (2008–2009)
 Sounds Good (1976)
 Space Command (1953–1954)
 Spirit Bay (1982–1987)
 Sports Weekend
 Spotlight on Film (1969)
 Stage Door (1960)
 Star Chart (1980)
 The Stationary Ark (1975)
 Steven and Chris (2008–2015)
 Stock Car Races (1953–1954)
 Stompin' Tom's Canada (1974–1975)
 Story Seat (1962)
 Strange Empire (2014–2015)
 Strange Paradise (1969–1970)
 Street Cents (teen/consumer affairs) (1989–2006)
 Street Legal (1987–2019)
 The Stu Davis Show (1966)
 Summer Camping (1957)
 Summer Close-Up (1977)
 Summer Evening (1976)
 Summer Festival (1980)
 Summer Sounds '66 (1966)
 Summerscope (1980)
 Sunday Best (1971–1976)
 Sunday Pops Series (1977)
 Sunday Report
 Sunshine Canada (1967)
 The Superior Sex (1961)
 Swingaround (1967–1970)
 Switchback (children)/(teens) 
 Switzer Unlimited (1976)
 Tabloid (1953–1960)
 Take 30 (1962–1984)
 TallBoyz
 Take Me Up to the Ball Game (1980)
 Talk About (1989–1990)
 The Tapp Room (1956–1958)
 Telescope (1963–1973)
 The Tenth Decade (1971)
 Terry and Me (1956)
 Their Springtime of Life (1972)
 Theme in Seven (1955)
 Theodore Tugboat
 Theologo '67 (1968)
 They All Play Ragtime (1981)
 This Hour Has Seven Days (1964–1966)
 This Is the Law (1971–1976)
 This Is Wonderland (2004–2006)
 This Land (1970–1982)
 This Life (2015–2016)
 This Space for Rent (2006)
 This Week in Parliament 
 Time for Sunday School (1962–1966)
 Titans (1981–1982)
 To See Ourselves (1971–1973)
 To the Wild Country (1972–1975)
 Toby (1968–1969)
 Tom Stone (2002)
 Trickster (2020)
 The Town Above (1959–1960)
 The Tommy Banks Show (1971–1974)
 The Tommy Hunter Show 
 True North Calling (2017)
 Twelve for Summer (1966–1977)
 Twenty Million Questions (1966–1969)
 Twitch City (1998–2000)
 Two for Physics (1959)
 The Undaunted (1983)
 Under the Umbrella Tree (1986–1993)
 Undercurrents (1994–2001)
 Underdogs
 Up at Ours (1980–81)
 Urban Angel (1991–1993)
 The Urban Peasant
 V.I.P. (1973–1983)
The Vacant Lot (1993–1994)
 Venture (1985–2007)
 Video Hits (1984–1993)
 Vietnam: The Ten Thousand Day War (documentary) (1980–1982)
 Viewpoint (Canadian TV program) (1957–76)
 Walter Ego (2005)
 The Watson Report (1975–1981)
 A Way Out (1970–1977)
 The Wayne and Shuster Show 
 The Weekly with Wendy Mesley (2018–2020)
 What It's Like Being Alone (2006)
 What on Earth (1971–1975)
 What's for Dinner? 
 What's New (1972–1989)
 Where the Sky Begins (1976)
 The Whiteoaks of Jalna (1972)
 Wicks (1979–1981)
 Wild Roses (2009)
 Wind at My Back (1996–2001)
 The Winners (1982)
 Witness (1992–2004)
 Wojeck (1966–1968)
 Wok with Yan (1980–1982)
 Wonderstruck (1986–1992)
 The World of Man (1970–1975)
 The World on Stage (1967)
 X Company (2015–2017)
 Yes You Can (1980–1983)
 Young Chefs 
 Young Drunk Punk (2015)
 ZeD (interactive) (2002–2006)
 Zut! (1970–1971)

Children's programming (post-1994)

Foreign-produced programming

 Absolutely Fabulous (1994–1999)
 The Adventures of Black Beauty (1973–1976)
 All in the Family (1972–1979)
 All My Children Albion Market Archie Bunker's Place (1979–1982)
 Arrested Development As the World Turns Banished (2015–present)
 Barney Miller (1975–1985)
 The Beverly Hillbillies (1966–1971)
 Billy Liar Blossom (1993–1995)
 The Bob Newhart Show (1972–1977)
 Bonanza (1961–1970)
 Boy Dominic The Brothers McGregor Buffalo Bill (1984)
 The Bugs Bunny Show (1961–1975)
 Cannon (1971–1975)
 Can't Hurry Love (1995–1996)
 Commonwealth Televiews (1957-1958)
 Carol & Company (1990–1991)
 The Carol Burnett Show (1972–1978)
 The Catherine Tate Show Chico and the Man (1974–1977)
 Crossing Lines (2013–present)
 Dallas (1978–1991)
 Designing Women (1986–1993)
 The Dick Van Dyke Show (1969–1973)
 Diff'rent Strokes (1978–1990)
 Disney Parks Christmas Day Parade (1983–2018)
 Doctor Who (2005)
 Dragnet (1954–1958)
 Dragnet (1967–1968)
 The Edge of Night The Ed Sullivan Show (1954–1971)
 The Electric Company (1973–1975)
 Elephant Boy Emmerdale Empty Nest (1988–1997)
 The Facts of Life (1979–1992)
 Fame (1982–1984)
 Family Matters (1993–1998)
 Father Ted (1997–1998)
 Fawlty Towers (1976–1977, 1979)
 The Flintstones The Fresh Prince of Bel-Air (1990–1998)
 The George Burns and Gracie Allen Show Generations Getting Together Ghost Whisperer (2009–2010)
 The Golden Girls (1985–1996)
 The Golden Palace (1992–1993)
 The Governor & J.J. (1969–1970)
 Grange Hill (1982–1984)
 Green Acres Guiding Light Gunsmoke Happy Days (1974–1984)
 Hardcastle and McCormick Have Gun-Will Travel Here's Lucy (1972–1974)
 Highway Patrol The Honeymooners The Huckleberry Hound Show (1959–1964)
 Hustle I Love Lucy The Jim Henson Hour (1989–1991)
 Jekyll and Hyde (2016–present)
 Jeopardy! (2008–2012)
 Joanie Loves Chachi (1982)
 Kate & Allie (1984–1992)
 Laurel and Hardy (1956–1958, 1968–1972)
 Leave It to Beaver Love Child (2015–present)
 The Lucy Show (1963–1964)
 Mary Kay and Johnny The Mary Tyler Moore Show (1971–1980)
 M*A*S*H (1972–1983)
 Maude (1972–1975, 1986–1987)
 The Mickey Mouse Club (1955–1959)
 The Mommies (1993–1995)
 Mork and Mindy (1978–1982)
 Mr. Bean (1992–2005)
 The Muppet Show (1976–1982)
 Murder, She Wrote (1984–1986)
 The Nanny (1993–1996)
 Newhart (1982–1995)
 The New Dick Van Dyke Show (1971–1973)
 One Life to Live (1993–1997)
 The Paper Chase (1978, 1981)
 Pardon the Expression The Partridge Family (1970–1976)
 Peanuts (1966–1996)*
 Please Like Me (2013–16)
 The Perry Como Show Phyllis Police Story Ponderosa The Prisoner Pretty Hard Cases (2021–23)
 The Quick Draw McGraw Show (1960–1963)
 Raised by Wolves (2015–present)
 Remington Steele Return of the Saint Return to Eden Rhoda Rocky and His Friends (1959–1964)
 The Ropers (1979–1980)
 Round the Twist Ryan's Hope Salty (1975, 1977)
 Search for Tomorrow The Secret Diary of Adrian Mole Secrets & Lies Sesame Street/Canadian Sesame Street (1970–1996)
 The Simpsons Soul Train Space: 1999 Star Trek (1988–1995)
 The Super 6 (1966–1967)
 Taxi That Girl Thirtysomething This Week in Baseball Three's a Crowd (1984–1985)
 Three's Company (1977–1987)
 The Tomorrow People (1977)
 The Tony Randall Show Too Close for Comfort (1980–1986)
 Torchwood Trapper John, M.D. (1986–1990)
 Turn Out the Lights The Undersea World of Jacques Cousteau Upstairs, Downstairs Vision On (1975–1978, 1982)
 The Waltons (1973–1976)
 Welcome Back, Kotter (1975–1977)
 Wheel of Fortune (2008–2012)
 The White Shadow (1979–1981)
 Wild Bill (March 9, 2020 – 6 June 2020)
 WKRP in Cincinnati (1978–1982)
 The Wonder Years (1988–1999)
 The Wonderful World of Disney (1988–2007)
 The Woody Woodpecker Show'' (1957–1959, 1963–1964, 1971)

See also
 Lists of Canadian television series
 List of Canadian television channels

References

Notes

External links
 Queen's University: Directory of CBC Television Series 1952–1982
 CBC Television Programming through the years – Canadian Communications Foundation

CBC Television